Terlingua (February 7, 1976 – April 29, 2008) was an American thoroughbred bred in Kentucky by Tom Gentry. She was a chestnut filly from the second crop of Triple Crown winner Secretariat. Terlingua was out of a Crimson Satan mare, Crimson Saint, who was a graded stakes winner as well as a very successful broodmare. Besides Terlingua, Crimson Saint produced 1990 Ireland Champion 3yr-old and European Champion 3yr-old Miler  Royal Academy and the grade one stakes winner (full brother) Pancho Villa along with four other winners, one of which was a minor stakes winner with another that was stakes placed. 

Terlingua was a record-breaking stakes winner, and was also the dam of the two-time leading sire in North America, Storm Cat. Through him and Littleprincessemma, she was the great-great-grandam of 2015 U.S. Triple Crown winner American Pharoah. Terlingua was known as The Crown Princess.

Race career

Terlingua was purchased by her trainer, Hall of Famer D. Wayne Lukas, as a yearling in 1977 for $275,000 on behalf of L. R. French, who later partnered with Barry Beal. Expected to be a winner, she lived up to the expectations. Her first race was a stakes at Hollywood Park. Terlingua won the Nursery Stakes by  four and a half lengths and broke the stakes record. She then won the grade II Hollywood Lassie Stakes by three and a half lengths before she challenged males in the Hollywood Juvenile Championship, which she won by two and a half lengths. In her next start, she defeated fillies in the Del Mar Debutante by nine lengths. Talk of her replicating her father's Triple Crown sweep soon started.  This, however, was not the case when Terlingua returned to the track as a 3-year-old, because she never regained her 2-year-old form. She did win two stakes at age 3, her 3yo debut Santa Ynez and 3yo finale Las Flores, while breaking the stakes record--she lost 5 in a row between these two stakes wins, and one more at age 4. She also broke one more stake record at 4, in the third running of the La Brea @ 7 furlongs,  before she was retired at the end of that season to Overbrook Farms following an injury to her right front knee.  Terlingua brought Lukas so much attention he made the decision to become a full-time thoroughbred trainer.

Breeding career

Terlingua's greatest accomplishment came on the farm. Her first foal was a filly by Lyphard named Lyphard's Dancer who never raced. In 1983, she gave birth to her second foal, a brown colt by the stallion Storm Bird. Storm Cat was Terlingua's first stakes winner with his victory in the Grade 1 Young America Stakes. He later became one of the most influential stallions of recent times. At Storm Cat's height, he commanded a stud fee of (USD) $500,000; pensioned in 2008, he sired over 15 millionaires and many other stakes winners. In 1984, Terlingua gave birth to another stakes winner, a chestnut filly by Northern Dancer named Chapel of Dreams. She won the Grade II Palomar Handicap and Grade II Wilshire Handicap. Terlingua then gave birth to a Slew of Gold colt, Tiajuana. He was never a stakes winner but became a sire in India.  Her next foal was a chestnut colt by Alydar named Provo, who became a very successful sire in Cyprus. Terlingua was bred back to Alydar the next year, and the result was her chestnut son Wheaton. He was a modest sire, getting many ungraded stakes winners.

In 1992, she gave birth to a Mr. Prospector filly named Pueblo who was later exported to South America.  Bred back to Mr. Prospector in 1993, she produced Pioneering, a stallion who became a successful sire in the US, producing the Grade-1-winning mare Behaving Badly and the Jamaican Champion Sprinter Quite Strength. Terlingua then produced the first and only full sibling to Storm Cat, a brother called Namesake. He never became a winner or a sire.  Two years later, she had a filly by Carson City named City Gold. In 2000, she gave birth to another filly, this one by Boston Harbor. Her last foal, a filly named Final Legacy, was very small and since Terlingua had missed several breeding seasons, her connections didn't want to push her any further and retired her from breeding.

Her impact on the present bloodlines will be felt for many more years to come. Her trainer Lukas once said of her influence, “Without a doubt, if you're around Storm Cat like I've been and trained so many of his offspring, they're Terlingua through and through. They walk like her, they look like her, they've got her attitude. The mother's influence was very strong there.” Among others, Terlingua is the great-great-grandam of 2015 U.S. Triple Crown winner American Pharoah.

Progeny Record:

Death

Upon retirement in 2001, Terlingua was moved out into a pasture at the Young family's Overbrook Farm near Lexington, Kentucky, with a test mare named Ashley as a companion. There she spent her final years until her death in 2008. Terlingua was euthanized at the age of 32 on April 29 due to complications from the infirmities of old age. In significant honor to her brood-mare career, her lineage, and her racing descendants, she was buried in Overbrook's horse cemetery.

Pedigree

References

1976 racehorse births
2008 racehorse deaths
Thoroughbred family 8-c
Racehorses bred in Kentucky
Racehorses trained in the United States